Verkhneyanaktayevo (Ürge Yanaqtay) is a rural locality (a village) in Verkhneyanaktayevsky Selsoviet, Baltachevsky District, Bashkortostan, Russia. The population was 171 as of 2010. There are 6 streets.

Geography 
Verkhneyanaktayevo is located 8 km southeast of Starobaltachevo (the district's administrative centre) by road. Nizhneyanaktayevo is the nearest rural locality.

References 

Rural localities in Baltachevsky District